Derrick Gibson (born March 22, 1979) is a former NFL safety who played his entire career for the Oakland Raiders. He was drafted by the Raiders in the first round (28th overall) in the 2001 NFL Draft. He played college football at Florida State.

Career

College 
An All-American at his hometown Miami Killian High School, Gibson was rated the number-one prospect in the state of Florida by many analysts. He was a four-year letterman at Florida State University who finished his career with 214 tackles, nine stops for losses, seven interceptions and 16 pass deflections.

Gibson participated in three BCS National Championships at Florida State, including the 1999 win over Virginia Tech.

Professional
Prior to the 2001 NFL Draft, he was credited with a 4.45 40 yard dash from his Pro Day workout. He spent his entire career for the Raiders from 2001 to 2006.

Coaching
Gibson has since returned to Miami Killian High School as the head football coach. Killian High is a state champion in the 6A classification.

References

Living people
1979 births
Players of American football from Miami
American football safeties
Florida State Seminoles football players
Oakland Raiders players